Arthur Robert Naghten (23 April 1829 – 7 August 1881) was a British Conservative politician.

He was the son of Thomas Naghten of Crofton House, Fareham, Hampshire and his wife Maria née Lang, they lived at Blighmont, Millbrook, Southampton.

He was elected MP for Winchester in 1874 but did not stand for re-election at the next election in 1880.

References

External links
 

UK MPs 1874–1880
1829 births
1881 deaths
Conservative Party (UK) MPs for English constituencies